Md. Sadek Khan is a Bangladesh Awami League politician and the incumbent Member of Parliament from Dhaka-13.

Education and career
Sadek khan was a member of Dhaka College students' league on 1973. Later he completed BA (honors) on history from Dhaka University. In 1997, Sadek Khan was elected as the youngest councilor of the undivided Dhaka City Corporation and served until 2001. He was elected councilor four times from the then Ward No. 47 and the current Ward No. 34.  He also received the best councilor award.  He then served as Acting Mayor twice.  In 1992, he became the president of Ward No. 47 Awami League.  After that, he served as the President of Mohammadpur Police Station Awami League from 1996 to 2015. He served as the President of the Election Management Committee of Dhaka-13 Constituency in the 1996, 2001 and 2008 Jatiya Sangsad elections.  Sadek Khan was a member of the Dhaka College Chhatra League in 1973.  He is the former General Secretary of Dhaka City North Awami League. He is the vice president of the Dhaka City North unit of Bangladesh Awami League. Sadek khan was elected to parliament from Dhaka-13 as a Bangladesh Awami League candidate 30 December 2018.

References

Living people
People from Dhaka
University of Dhaka alumni
Awami League politicians
11th Jatiya Sangsad members
Year of birth missing (living people)